is a professional Go player.

Biography 
Hikosaka turned pro in 1976 at the age of 14

Titles & runners-up

References

External links
GoBase Profile
Nihon Ki-in Profile (Japanese)

1962 births
Japanese Go players
Living people
People from Nagoya